Kuras or Kuraś is a surname. Notable people with the surname include:

 Benjamin Kuras (born 1944), Anglo–Czech writer
 Ellen Kuras (born 1959), American cinematographer
 Józef Kuraś (1915–1947), Polish Army officer
 Magdalena Kuras (born 1988), Swedish swimmer
 Mariusz Kuras (born 1965), Polish footballer
Ed Kuras (born 1963), American Entrepreneur

See also
 

Polish-language surnames